Cocoto Platform Jumper is a platform video game released by Neko Entertainment in 2004. The game has been released on different platforms in the PAL regions including the GameCube, PlayStation 2, Game Boy Advance and Microsoft Windows. It was released for WiiWare in North America on April 27, 2009 and in the PAL regions on June 12.

Gameplay
The game sees players controlling Cocoto, a little red imp, across a number of spiraling levels. The gameplay is very similar to that of Taito's Rainbow Islands: The Story of Bubble Bobble 2, with the player using magma arches the same way as the rainbows in said game, collecting items and power-up, defeating enemies, and reaching the top of the level before time runs out. Cocoto can use his pitchfork as a projectile to defeat enemies, or use the arches. Fairy will appear as a checkpoint. The game features 40 levels spanning across 5 different worlds. There are 30 enemies that vary depending on the level, and the end of each world features a boss fight. There is a two player battle mode where both players defeat each other's imps, and a four player race, where the first imp that reaches the top is the winner.

The Game Boy Advance version has the game play in 2D due to technical limitations.

Reception

The Wii version received "mixed" reviews according to the review aggregation website Metacritic.

References

External links
 

2004 video games
Game Boy Advance games
GameCube games
PlayStation 2 games
Neko Entertainment games
Windows games
Platform games
Video games developed in France
WiiWare games
Wii games
Single-player video games
Nacon games